Piga or PIGA may refer to:

People
 Aldo Piga (1928–1994), Italian composer
 Gustavo Piga (born 1964), Italian economist

Other uses
 PIGA, an enzyme
 PIGA accelerometer, a type of accelerometer mainly used in Inertial Navigation Systems
 Piga (grape), an Italian wine grape
 Piqa or Cerro Piga, a mountain in the Andes on the border of Bolivia and Chile

See also
 Pica (disambiguation)